Gramella jeungdoensis is a Gram-negative, rod-shaped and non-motile bacterium from the genus of Gramella which has been isolated from a solar saltern in Korea.

References

Flavobacteria
Bacteria described in 2011